was a town located in Gamō District, Shiga Prefecture, Japan. 

As of 2003, the town had an estimated population of 12,217 and a density of 502.76 persons per km². The total area was 24.30 km².

On March 21, 2010, Azuchi was merged into the expanded city of Ōmihachiman.

The town is well known for the ruins of Azuchi Castle of Oda Nobunaga, the 16th century ruler of Japan. The period in the history of Japan approximately between 1568 and 1603 is called Azuchi-Momoyama period. Azuchi Castle ruins remain for the temple Soken-ji donated by Oda Nobunaga. He also established the oldest Christian Seminary in Japan, and its ruins are now a small public park.

Transportation 
Azuchi Station of The Biwako Line railway provides public transportation to the town.

The National Route 8 passes through the town.

External links 

 Azuchi Castle Photo Gallery at PHOTOGUIDE.JP

Dissolved municipalities of Shiga Prefecture
Ōmihachiman, Shiga